The Araniko Highway  connects Kathmandu with Kodari,   northeast of the Kathmandu Valley, on the Nepal-China border. It is among the most dangerous of highways in Nepal due to extremely steep slopes on each side of the road from Barabise onwards; massive landslides and bus plunges are not uncommon, especially after rains. At the Sino-Nepal Friendship Bridge, it connects with China National Highway 318 to Lhasa, and eventually to Shanghai.

History
The road was built in the 1960s with help from the Chinese on an older yak track. They also planned to expand the road in 2012, but keeping the route open was made more difficult by landslides from monsoons. The road became a conduit for a large amount of trade between China and Nepal, and also for some trade between India and China when it is open.

Etymology
The highway is named after Arniko, a 13th-century Nepalese architect who introduced Nepalese architectural styles to Tibet and China. It is said that he walked all the way from Tibet to China by the route which is now named after him.

Route
After Dhulikhel the road descends into the beautiful Panchkhal Valley. A road junction at Lamidanda, around 12 km from Dhulikhel, leads to Palanchowk where Palanchok Bhagawati Temple is situated. About five minutes' drive beyond the town of Panchkhal a dirt road takes off to the left, giving access to the Helambu region. About 8 km later the highway touches Dolaghat, a thriving town at the confluence of the Indravati and the Sun Kosi rivers and the departure point for many rafting trips. The turn-off to Jiri is another 14 km away, on the right. Lamosangu is a few kilometres after the Jiri turn-off, on the Arniko Highway. Next comes Barabise, the final destination for many buses from Kathmandu. Just before Barabise is the confluence of the Bhote Kosi and Sun Kosi rivers. The remaining part to the Nepal border village of Kodari the road runs alongside the Sun Kosi with extremely steep Himalayan mountainsides that are very prone to landslides during and immediately after rains (including the monsoon). Beyond Kodari is the border town of Zhangmu in Tibet.

Significance
The Aarniko Rajmarg provides Nepal's overland link with China. However, it is of limited use as an alternative route for transport of goods, as it is cheaper to ship Chinese goods via Kolkata than to truck them through China's Tibet region.  This situation is subject to change with major investment in road and rail on the Tibetan side.

Closures
The route was closed by the April 2015 earthquakes, but was re-opened in early August 2015. The route sustained heavy damage because of landslides triggered by the earthquake.

In 2014 the highway was closed after landslides, but re-opened in September 2014. The landslide shut the route to Kathmandu for 46 days until a new alternate route could be built for Rs. 15.5 million. The landslides that closed it the summer of 2014 were called the Sunkoshi landslides, and the section of the highway near the Tibet border is especially prone to landslides.

See also
 Friendship Highway (Tibet)

References

External links

Nepal Highways
Department of Roads

Highways in Nepal
Sites along the Silk Road
1960s establishments in Nepal